The Ocala National Forest ls the second largest nationally protected forest in the U.S. State of Florida. The Ocala National Forest, established in 1908, is the oldest national forest east of the Mississippi River  and the southernmost national forest in the continental U.S. The word Ocala is thought to be a derivative of a Timucuan term meaning "fair land" or "big hammock". The forest is headquartered in Tallahassee, as are all three National Forests in Florida, but there are local ranger district offices located in Silver Springs and Umatilla.

Geography and ecology
The Ocala National Forest lies between the Ocklawaha and St. Johns rivers in North Florida. In descending order of land area, it is located in parts of Marion, Lake, and Putnam counties.

The Ocala National Forest is in the southeastern conifer forests and the Florida sand pine scrub ecoregions. Dry, sandy areas support Florida longleaf pine sandhills and Florida peninsula inland scrub. Longleaf pine sandhills are woodlands dominated by longleaf pine (Pinus palustris). Inland scrub consists of sand pines (Pinus clausa) growing amid shrublands of evergreen oaks. Both of these pine communities are sustained by frequent fires. The Ocala National Forest contains a high proportion of remaining inland scrub habitat and is noted for its sand pine scrub ecosystem. The forest contains the largest concentration of sand pine in the world as well as some of the best remaining stands of longleaf pine in northern Florida.  Where fire is absent, southern coastal plain oak domes and hammocks can grow. These are small stands of thick evergreen oaks.

The forest contains several slow-moving rivers and numerous wet "prairies". Blackwater rivers support southern coastal plain blackwater river floodplain forests of baldcypress (Taxodium distichum) along their banks. The forest's spring-fed rivers support southern coastal plain hydric hammocks, hammocks of evergreen and hardwood trees, near their floodplains. The prairies are Floridian highlands freshwater marshes. Southern coastal plain nonriverine basin swamps are large, seasonally flooded depressions of baldcypress (Taxodium distichum) and swamp tupelo (Nyssa biflora).

The Ocala National Forest receives more visitors than any other national forest in the Sunshine State. Millions annually visit the forest, which is one of North Florida's last remaining traces of forested land. The forest’s porous sands and largely undeveloped character provide an important recharge for the Floridan Aquifer. The Rodman Reservoir system forms most of the northern and northwestern border as part of the Ocklawaha River Basin.

The Ocala Forest is also known for having over 600 natural lakes and ponds. Between the river boundaries of this Forest lie central highlands, coastal lowlands, swamps, springs, and hundreds of lakes and ponds. Near the Juniper Prairie Wilderness and Juniper Springs is "The Yearling Trail", the location where The Yearling was filmed.

Ocala has a wide variety of wildlife. The black bear population has its highest concentration here. Alligators, white-tailed deer, wild boar, and numerous small animals, including squirrels,  bats, coyote, gray fox, red fox, opossum, raccoon, river otter, bobcat, skunk, southeastern pocket gopher, and nine-banded armadillo can be found as well. The sandy soil is home to the gopher tortoise.

The United States Navy's Pinecastle Bombing Range in the Ocala National Forest is the only place on the East Coast where the Navy can do live impact training. The Navy drops nearly 20,000 bombs a year at the site, a few hundred of which are live. F/A-18 Hornet jet fighters and other aircraft take off from Naval Air Station Jacksonville or from aircraft carriers off the Florida coast, fly low over the forest, and drop their bombs in the middle  of the range. P-3 Orion and P-8 Poseidon aircraft will also use an instrumented range in the southeast quadrant of Lake George to conduct aerial mining training utilizing inert 500lb mines. All air-to-ground exercises using conventional ordnance up to and including  MK 82 bombs and five-inch (127 mm) Zuni rockets are authorized. Napalm and High Explosive Incendiary (HEI) are prohibited. Live ordnance is restricted to the Live Ordnance Impact Area; inert ordnance is used on all other targets. Pinecastle targets have also been certified for laser operations. The Navy has used the area for target practice for 50 years under a special use permit from the U.S. Forest Service.

The ghost town of Kerr City is in the forest. It is located on County Road 316 just west of State Road 19.

Activities

The Ocala National Forest has an accommodating climate for year-round recreation. The mild winters are fine for family camping while a summer canoe trip down a palm-lined stream is a cool way to spend an August day. The summer season is much warmer and wetter.

Water plays an important part in a variety of recreational opportunities in the forest. Activities range from canoeing, boating, fishing, skiing, snorkeling, scuba diving, swimming, and the use of personal watercraft. Several boat ramps are available in the forest.

Many hiking trails run through the forest including the Florida Trail, Salt Springs Observation Trail, Lake Eaton Sinkhole Trail, St. Francis Trail, and Yearling Trail.

Because this trail is not paved, bicycles need to be suited for rough terrain. Mountain bikes are ideal and encouraged for this environment.

The Ocala National Forest offers many locations to ride Off-Road Vehicles. A new trail system was added in 2008 to commemorate the 100th anniversary of the forest. It is part of the south trail system off FR 573.. SR 40, and the Big Scrub Campground. Some areas are restricted to off-road vehicles; a detailed forest map can help provide information on areas open to off-road vehicles.

There are many trails for horseback riding in the forest. Some of the best trails include the One Hundred Mile trail and the LAM trail.

The Ocala National Forest is a wildlife management area, in which hunting and fishing activities are managed by the Florida Fish and Wildlife Conservation Commission. A permit is required for all hunters (except those indicated as exempt) to hunt in this area. A Quota Hunt Permit may also be required during certain periods or certain game.

A public shooting range is located at the center of the National Forest Forest Road 11, north of S.R. 40 in the Ocala National Forest. GPS Coordinates:
29°11’16.80” N
81°46’14.15” W
12-position 100-yard rifle/handgun shooting range
One single-station, self-throw shotgun pad
Cost:
Free
Open daily from sunrise to sunset, except on Wednesday when closed until noon for maintenance. Closed sunset to sunrise, and Wednesday mornings until noon. This unsupervised facility in the Ocala National Forest offers a rifle and handgun range, and a single-station, self-throw shotgun pad. It was built with the cooperation of the U.S. Forest Service with funding provided by the Wildlife and Sport Fish Restoration Program (WSFR).

Lakes

The following is a list of lakes in or on the border of the forest:

 Blue Sink
 Lake Bryant
 Lake Delancy
 Lake Dexter
 Doe Lake
 Lake Dorr
 Lake George
 Halfmoon Lake
 Lake Kathryn

 Lake Kerr
 Lochloosa Lake
 Lake Mary
 Mill Dam Lake
 Lake Ocklawaha
 Orange Lake
 Lake Weir
 Wildcat Lake
 Lake Woodruff

Campsites

 Doe Lake –  western part of the forest, five miles (8 km) east of Lake Weir by the Ocklawaha River
 Salt Springs - within the town of Salt Springs.
 Big Bass Lake – southernmost campsite in the forest, known as a halfway mark between Weirsdale and Altoona
 Big Scrub – two miles (3 km) northeast of Doe Lake campsite, the nearest town is Moss Bluff
 Clearwater Lake Recreation Area – easternmost major campsite, close to Lake Woodruff National Wildlife Refuge, named after nearby Clearwater Lake – the nearest town to this campsite is Paisley
 Alexander Springs – about four miles (6 km) northeast of Buck Lake, close to CR 445, ten miles (16 km) southwest of Astor
 Halfmoon Lake – named after nearby Halfmoon Lake.
 Juniper Springs – lies near the junction of State Road 19 and State Road 40
 Fore Lake- Government campsite located 6.5 miles north of Hwy 40 on CR 314.
 Camp La-No-Che – a  Boy Scout camp located on the south side of the forest in the town of Paisley

Wilderness areas
There are four officially designated wilderness areas lying within Ocala National Forest that are part of the National Wilderness Preservation System.

 Alexander Springs Wilderness
 Billies Bay Wilderness
 Juniper Prairie Wilderness
 Little Lake George Wilderness

See also
 Apalachicola National Forest
 Osceola National Forest

References

External links

 Ocala National Forest official site at United States Forest Service
 Florida Scenic Trail
 Great Florida Birding Trail
 Ocala Florida Website
 Ocala/Marion Visitor & Convention Bureau's Ocala National Forest Web Page
 

 
National Forests of Florida
Protected areas of Lake County, Florida
Protected areas of Marion County, Florida
Protected areas of Putnam County, Florida
Protected areas of Seminole County, Florida
1908 establishments in Florida
Protected areas established in 1908